The 1902 Case football team represented the Case School of Applied Science in the American city of Cleveland, Ohio, now a part of Case Western Reserve University, during the 1902 college football season.  The team's coach was Joseph Wentworth. Case won its first conference title and first Ohio Athletic Conference title.

Coach Wentworth was the highest paid football coach in the US when hired in 1902 at $3,000.

Schedule

References

Case
Case Western Reserve Spartans football seasons
Case football